Eduard Georg Gustav von Below (December 29, 1856 - January 13, 1942)  was a German General of the Infantry who notably served in World War I.

Biography

Early life and family
Eduard came from the old noble family von Below. He was a son of Eduard Friedrich Wilhelm von Below (1815-1894) and his wife Marie Anna Friederike, born von Quistorp (1824-1886).

On March 11, 1887 at Scharstorf near Rostock Below married Countess Luise Friederike Agnes von Rantzau (born August 14, 1865 in Kiel, † February 15, 1947 in Eutin). The following children were born from the marriage:

Eduard Karl Robert (born December 25, 1887 in Rostock, † December 24, 1972 in Eutin)
Karl Georg Ulrich Paul (born June 27, 1891 in Carlshof near Wismar, † October 4, 1973 in Bern)

Military career
Below began military service on September 10, 1873, having completed cadet school, and was commissioned a second lieutenant in the Mecklenburgian 90th Infantry Regiment "Kaiser Wilhelm" in Rostock. From 1879 he served as a battalion adjutant and the following year, until July 1883, he was seconded for further training at the Prussian Staff College. For almost two years, from April 1887 to January 1889, he was adjutant of the Rostock district command. He then returned to his regular regiment and was promoted to captain and company commander at the same time. On October 18, 1895 Below was appointed as an adjutant on the staff of the 2nd Division. While staying in this position he, on September 12, 1896, was promoted to major and formally transferred to the 45th (8th East Prussian) Infantry Regiment. From June 15, 1898 to May 1, 1903 Below was commander of the 1st Battalion of the 2nd (1st Pomeranian) Grenadier Regiment "King Frederick William IV". Having been promoted to lieutenant colonel on April 18, 1903, he was then transferred to the staff of the Guards Fusilier Regiment. On January 27, 1906, he was given the task of leading the 96th (7th Thuringian) Infantry Regiment in Gera and was finally promoted to Colonel on April 10, 1906. In 1910 Below became the commander of the 17th Infantry Brigade, stationed in Glogau. From October 1, 1912 he was commander of the 9th Division.

Below led this division as part of the 5th Army at the beginning of World War I. From May 13, 1915 to February 1, 1917 he simultaneously was deputized to lead the V Corps before being named as its official commander. In the final days of the war Below commanded Army Detachment C. Afterwards Below led his troops back home, submitted his resignation and was put up for disposition on December 19, 1918.

Awards
Order of the Red Eagle, 2nd class
Order of the Crown, 2nd class
Service Award Cross
Order of the Griffon
Reussian Cross of Honor
Saxe-Ernestine House Order
Iron Cross, 1st and 2nd Class
Pour le Mérite on August 18, 1917

Foreign Awards
: Order of Saint Alexander
: Order of Saint Anna, 2nd Class

References

Bibliography
Hanns Möller: History of the knights of the order pour le mérite in the world war. Volume I: A-L. Verlag Bernard & Graefe, Berlin 1935, pp. 60-61.
Karl-Friedrich Hildebrand, Christian Zweng: The knights of the order Pour le Mérite of the First World War. Volume 1: A-G. Biblio Verlag, Osnabrück 1999, d ISBN 3-7648-2505-7 , pp. 76-78.

1856 births
1942 deaths
Generals of Infantry (Prussia)
German Army generals of World War I
Recipients of the Pour le Mérite (military class)
Recipients of the Iron Cross (1914), 1st class
Recipients of the Iron Cross (1914), 2nd class
People from Pomerania
Below family
Military personnel from Mecklenburg-Western Pomerania